The Love Story of Aliette Brunton is a romance novel by the British writer Gilbert Frankau which was first published in 1922.

Film adaptation
In 1924 the novel was adapted into a film The Love Story of Aliette Brunton made by Stoll Pictures and directed by Maurice Elvey.

References

Bibliography
 Goble, Alan. The Complete Index to Literary Sources in Film. Walter de Gruyter, 1999.

1922 British novels
Novels set in England
British novels adapted into films
Novels by Gilbert Frankau
British romance novels